Danny Andrews is a paralympic athlete from the United States competing mainly in category T44 sprint events.

Andrews competed in the 800m at the 2000 Summer Paralympics but it was in moving down in distance in the 2004 Summer Paralympics that he won three Paralymipc gold medals in the 400m, 4 × 100 m and 4 × 400 m as well as competing in the 200m.  In the 2008 Summer Paralympics he competed in the 200m and 400m but could not match the success of four years earlier and ended up without any medals. This was in part due to an injury that occurred from a collision during the warmups for the 400m Finals.

References

External links 
 
 

Paralympic track and field athletes of the United States
Athletes (track and field) at the 2000 Summer Paralympics
Athletes (track and field) at the 2004 Summer Paralympics
Athletes (track and field) at the 2008 Summer Paralympics
Paralympic gold medalists for the United States
Living people
American male sprinters
American male middle-distance runners
Medalists at the 2000 Summer Paralympics
Medalists at the 2004 Summer Paralympics
Year of birth missing (living people)
Paralympic medalists in athletics (track and field)
Sprinters with limb difference
Middle-distance runners with limb difference
Paralympic sprinters
Paralympic middle-distance runners
21st-century American people